Michael Rivers Morgan (born October 22, 1955) is an African-American judge from the state of North Carolina. Morgan is currently an associate justice of the North Carolina Supreme Court. Previously, he served as a judge on the 3rd division of North Carolina Superior Court for Judicial Circuit 10B.

In the 2016 election, Judge Morgan defeated 16-year incumbent Supreme Court Justice Robert H. Edmunds Jr., winning 54.45% of the votes and a majority of the state's counties.

Morgan is an alumnus of Duke University (A.B. degree, 1976) and North Carolina Central University (J.D. degree, 1979).

See also 
 List of African-American jurists

References

1955 births
Living people
Duke University alumni
North Carolina Central University alumni
North Carolina Democrats
Justices of the North Carolina Supreme Court
Superior court judges in the United States
21st-century American judges